Metal clay is a crafting medium consisting of very small particles of metal such as silver, gold, bronze, or copper mixed with an organic binder and water for use in making jewelry, beads and small sculptures. Originating in Japan in 1990, metal clay can be shaped just like any soft clay, by hand or using molds. After drying, the clay can be fired in a variety of ways such as in a kiln, with a handheld gas torch, or on a gas stove, depending on the type of clay and the metal in it.  The binder burns away, leaving the pure sintered metal. Shrinkage of between 8% and 30% occurs (depending on the product used). Alloys such as bronze, sterling silver, and steel also are available.

History
Metal clay first came out in Japan in 1990 to allow craft jewelry makers to make sophisticated looking jewelry without the years of study needed to make fine jewelry.

Silver metal clay

Fine silver metal clay results in objects containing 99.9% pure silver, which is suitable for enameling. Lump metal clay is sold in sealed packets to keep it moist and workable. The silver versions are also available as a softer paste in a pre-filled syringe which can be used to produce extruded forms, in small jars of slip and as paper-like sheets, from which most of the moisture has been removed. Common brands of silver metal clay include Precious Metal Clay (PMC) and Art Clay Silver (ACS).

Metal clay artists looking for more strength in their silver creations can also mix PMC fine silver clay with an equal part of PMC Sterling clay.

Another available alloy, EZ960 Sterling Silver Metal Clay was invented by Bill Struve from Metal Adventures, the inventor of BRONZclay™ and COPPRclay™. Because the clay is a sterling silver alloy, one of its best attributes is its post firing strength, in comparison to fine silver. No carbon required. Its shrinkage rate is smaller than other clays, at 10–11%.

Precious Metal Clay (PMC)
PMC was developed in the early 1990s in Japan by metallurgist Masaki Morikawa. As a solid-phase sintered product of a precious metal powder used to form a precious metal article, the material consists of microscopic particles of pure silver or fine gold and a water-soluble, non-toxic, organic binder that burns off during firing. Success was first achieved with gold and later duplicated with silver. 
The PMC brand includes the following products:
PMC+ is also available in sheet form which can be worked like paper; for example, for origami.
It can also be fired using a butane torch by heating it to orange heat for at least 2 minutes. It has a longer working life than the older formulations. It is also available in slip and paste forms which can be painted onto the surface of an object to be used as a mold.
 Aura 22: a 22-carat gilding material, a gold paste intended to be painted onto the surface of silver PMC pieces, or ready-made silver objects.
 PMC Pro: a harder product which is only 0.900 fineness silver, hence it cannot be hallmarked as sterling silver.
Because of the copper content in this formula, firing is a two-step process; step one is an open-shelf firing and step two requires a firing pan with activated carbon media.

Art Clay Silver (ACS)
ACS was developed by AIDA Chemical Industries, also a Japanese company. ACS followed PMC Standard with their Art Clay Original clay (more like PMC+ than PMC Standard), which allows the user to fire with a handheld torch or on a gas hob. Owing to subtle differences in the binder and suggested firing times, this clay shrinks less than the PMC versions, approximately 8–10%.

Further developments introduced the Art Clay Slow Dry, a clay with a longer working time. AIDA also manufacturers Oil Paste, a product used only on fired metal clay or milled fine silver, and Overlay Paste, which is designed for drawing designs on glass and porcelain.

In 2006 AIDA introduced the Art Clay Gold Paste, a more economical way to work with gold. The paste is painted onto the fired silver clay, then refired in a kiln, or with a torch or gas stove. When fired, it bonds with the silver, giving a 22-carat gold accent. The same year also saw Art Clay Slow Tarnish introduced, a clay that tarnishes less rapidly than the other metal clays.

Base metal clays
Lump metal clay in bronze was introduced in 2008 by Metal Adventures Inc. and in 2009 by Prometheus. Lump metal clays in copper were introduced in 2009 by Metal Adventures Inc. and Aida. Because of the lower cost, the bronze and copper metal clays are used by artists more often than the gold and silver metal clays in the American market place. The actual creation time of a bronze or copper piece is also far greater than that of its silver counterpart. Base metal clays, such as bronze, copper, and steel metal clays are best fired in the absence of oxygen to eliminate the oxidation of the metal by atmospheric oxygen. A means to accomplish this –- to place the pieces in activated carbon inside a container – was developed by Bill Struve.

Powders
Metal clays are also available as dry powders to which water is added to hydrate and kneaded to attain a clay consistency.  One advantage to the powders is their unlimited shelf life. The first silver clay in powder form was released in 2006 as Silver Smiths' Metal Clay Powder. In the following years base metal clays by Hadar Jacobson and Goldie World released several variation containing copper, brass, and even steel.

Firing methods 
Metal clay can be fired by a variety of methods.  The three most common are:

 Electric kiln- Kilns designed for metal clay are programmable and easy to use.  All clay types can be fired by this method.  This is the only way paper type and copper clays can be fired.
 Stove top- Either natural or bottled gas can be used, provided it reaches the temperature necessary to sinter.  Color of the piece determines the firing time.
 Torch- Any type of hand-held torch will work as long as it is hot enough to sinter the metal.  Color determines firing time.

See also

References

Ceramic materials
Crafts
Fashion accessories
Jewellery making
Metalworking
Natural materials
Phyllosilicates
Products introduced in 1990
Sculpture materials
Clay